John Mahon (born 1886) was an English professional footballer who played as a half back.

After playing for minor teams Clowne White Star and Worksop Town he joined Football League club Gainsborough Trinity in 1908. He played 22 times for the club before joining New Brompton in 1909. He remained with the club, later renamed Gillingham, until 1920 and made over 250 appearances. He also gained the club's first ever representative honour when he played for a Southern League XI against an equivalent team from The Football League in 1910.

In 1920 he left Gillingham to join Doncaster Rovers where he played in their first game in their return to football following WW1, in the 2–1 defeat to Rotherham Town in the Midland League. He scored 3 goals during that season, 2 of them as penalties.

His son, also called Jack Mahon, played professionally, notably for Leeds United and West Bromwich Albion in the 1930s.

References

1886 births
English footballers
Sportspeople from Northwich
Association football wing halves
Gillingham F.C. players
Doncaster Rovers F.C. players
Gainsborough Trinity F.C. players
Southern Football League players
Midland Football League players
Year of death missing